NudC domain-containing protein 3 is a protein that in humans is encoded by the NUDCD3 gene.

Function 

The product of this gene functions to maintain the stability of dynein intermediate chain. Depletion of this gene product results in aggregation and degradation of dynein intermediate chain, mislocalization of the dynein complex from kinetochores, spindle microtubules, and spindle poles, and loss of gamma-tubulin from spindle poles. The protein localizes to the Golgi apparatus during interphase, and levels of the protein increase after the G1/S transition.

References

Further reading